Jalan Sultan Salahuddin (formerly Swettenham Road) is a major road in Kuala Lumpur, Malaysia. It was named after Almarhum Sultan Salahuddin Abdul Aziz Shah of Selangor, the eleventh Yang di-Pertuan Agong.

List of junctions

Roads in Kuala Lumpur